Konradowa  is a village in the administrative district of Gmina Nysa, within Nysa County, Opole Voivodeship, in south-western Poland.

References

Konradowa